RTMC may refer to:

 RTMC Astronomy Expo, a gathering of amateur astronomers, formally known as Riverside Telescope Makers Conference.
 Royal Thai Marine Corps, the marines of the Royal Thai Navy.